Ali Çamdalı (born 22 February 1984) is a German former professional footballer who played as a midfielder, spending most of his career in Turkey.

Career
Born in Duisburg, West Germany, Çamdalı played youth football for local clubs GSG Duisburg and Duisburger FV 08. In 2016 he captained Süper Lig club Konyaspor. In June 2017, he played in the final of the 2016–17 Turkish Cup, which Konyaspor won against İstanbul Başakşehir.

Honours
Kayserispor
Turkish Cup: 2008

Konyaspor
Turkish Cup: 2016–17
Turkish Super Cup: 2017

References

External links
 
 
 
 

1984 births
Living people
German people of Turkish descent
German footballers
Turkish footballers
Footballers from Duisburg
Association football midfielders
Süper Lig players
Kayserispor footballers
Kayseri Erciyesspor footballers
Kocaelispor footballers
Orduspor footballers
Konyaspor footballers
Çaykur Rizespor footballers
Manisa FK footballers